"Woodpeckers from Space" is a song by the Dutch Eurodisco/Italo disco duo VideoKids. A synth-pop cover of "The Woody Woodpecker Song", it was released in 1984 by Boni Records through their sublabel Break Records as the duo's debut single, as well as the sixth track from their debut studio album, The Invasion of the Spacepeckers (1984).

Background
The song was written and produced by Aart Mol, Cees Bergman, Elmer Veerhoff, Erwin van Prehn and Geertjan Hessing (under the pseudonym "Adams & Fleisner"), all of whom were former members of the Dutch glam rock band Catapult. 

The idea for the song began when the son of Gert van den Bosch (co-founder of Boni Records) asked him if he could produce a record based on Woody Woodpecker, whom the son was a big fan of. The song was recorded at Cat Music, which Mol, Bergman, Veerhoff, Prehn and Hessing had formed in 1979. The vocals were done by Bergman and Sylvia and Anita Crooks of the vocal trio The Internationals.

The album version of the song features sound effects from the Speak & Spell toy.

Music video
The music video starred Peter Slaghuis and Bianca Bonelli, hired by Cat Music to be the members of the group. In the video, the woodpecker plays one prank after another on the Slaghuis/Bonelli flight crew, messing with their spaceship and leaving the duo hardly any time to sing. The video was filmed in the Airplane Museum at Amsterdam Airport Schiphol. Peter, Bianca and the flight crew's pilots and scientists lip-sync to Cees Bergman, Sylvia and Anita Crooks' vocals during the video. In order to avoid being sued by Universal Studios, a new character named Tico Tac was created as the group's mascot and used in place of Woody. Tico was designed by Dirk Arend, who was occasionally doing cover artwork designs for Boni Records and Break Records under the pseudonym "Fruut" at the time, and animated by Bjørn Frank Jensen and coloured by Frits Godhelp at Toonder Studio's.

Cover versions
The song was covered by the South African outfit Café Society in 1985, with their version holding the No. 1 position on the South African Top 20 for 8 weeks, and by the Norwegian bubblegum/trance/dance group SpritneyBears in 2003 (their cover laid in second place on the Norwegian chart, spending 8 weeks on that chart in total). It was also featured in the Pingu episode, "Pingu Helps with Incubating", although it has been replaced by David Hasselhoff's "Pingu-Dance" in its newer version.

Charts

References

1984 songs
1984 debut singles
Number-one singles in Norway
Polydor Records singles
Songs about birds
Songs about outer space
Eurodisco songs
Italo disco songs